Rowland Roberts Hughes (1896–1957) was a director of the United States' Office of Management and Budget from April 16, 1954 until April 1, 1956. Hughes, known for his distinctive black eye patch, was called "the logical man" in a 1956 Time Magazine cover story.

Hughes was born in Oakhurst, New Jersey, and attended Brown University. After graduating from college in 1917, he went to work for the National City Bank of New York. For several years he was assigned to various overseas branches of the Bank, but returned to work at the Bank's headquarters in New York City in 1927. Hughes and his family resided in the Sutton Manor community of New Rochelle, New York during this period of career growth and professional achievement in banking.

In April 1953, Hughes was appointed deputy director of the Bureau of the Budget. He became Director of the Bureau in April 1954 following the resignation of Joseph Dodge. As Director, Hughes was responsible for preparing the national budget of the U.S. government. Due to his efforts the 1956 budget produced a surplus. This was the first balanced budget of President Dwight D. Eisenhower's administration.

Hughes retired from government service in April 1956 and died of arteriosclerosis on April 2, 1957, in San Francisco, California.

References

External links
 Papers of Rowland R. Hughes, Dwight D. Eisenhower Presidential Library

1957 deaths
1896 births
Brown University alumni
Directors of the Office of Management and Budget
Eisenhower administration cabinet members
People from Ocean Township, Monmouth County, New Jersey
Politicians from New Rochelle, New York